The Patna–Mughalsarai section is a railway line connecting  in the Indian state of Bihar and  in Uttar Pradesh.

History
The first rail track between Howrah and Delhi was via what was later named as Sahibganj loop and the first through train on the route was run in 1864. The Patna–Mughalsarai sector was ready around 1862. A "shorter main line" connecting Raniganj and Kiul was in position in 1871 and the opening of the Grand Chord in 1907 shortened the distance from Howrah to Delhi even further.

Electrification
While the Mughalsarai area was electrified in 1961–65, the rest of the Patna–Mughalsarai section was electrified in 1999–2002. Sector-wise electrification was as follows: Fatuha–Danapur 1999–2000, Danapur–Dildarnagar 2001–2002, Kuchman–Dilarnagar 1999–2000.

Speed limit
The entire Sitarampur–Patna–Mughalsarai line is classified as "B Class" line, where trains can run at speeds up to 130 km/h.

Passenger movement
Patna and Mughalsarai, on this line, are amongst the top hundred booking stations of Indian Railway.

Railway reorganisation 
In 1952, Eastern Railway,  Northern Railway and North Eastern Railway were formed. Eastern Railway was formed with a portion of East Indian Railway Company, east of Mughalsarai and Bengal Nagpur Railway. Northern Railway was formed with a portion of East Indian Railway Company west of Mughalsarai, Jodhpur Railway, Bikaner Railway and Eastern Punjab Railway. North Eastern Railway was formed with Oudh and Tirhut Railway, Assam Railway and a portion of Bombay, Baroda and Central India Railway. East Central Railway was created in 1996–97.

See also 
 Patna–Digha Ghat line

References

External links
Trains at Patna
Trains at Mughalsarai

|

5 ft 6 in gauge railways in India

Railway lines in Bihar
Railway lines in Uttar Pradesh
Railway lines opened in 1862
1862 establishments in India
Transport in Mughalsarai
Transport in Patna